Nepenthes madagascariensis (from Madagascar) is one of two Nepenthes pitcher plant species native to Madagascar, the other being N. masoalensis.

Botanical history

Nepenthes madagascariensis was the first Nepenthes species to be scientifically described; Étienne de Flacourt recorded it in 1658 under the name Amramatico. He published a description of the plant in his seminal work Histoire de la Grande Isle de Madagascar. It reads:

It is a plant growing about 3 feet high which carries at the end of its leaves, which are 7 inches long, a hollow flower or fruit resembling a small vase, with its own lid, a wonderful sight. There are red ones and yellow ones, the yellow being the biggest. The inhabitants of this country are reluctant to pick the flowers, saying that if somebody does pick them in passing, it will not fail to rain that day. As to that, I and all the other Frenchmen did pick them, but it did not rain. After rain these flowers are full of water, each one containing a good half-glass. [translated from French in Pitcher-Plants of Borneo]

Ecology
Nepenthes madagascariensis occurs along the eastern coast of Madagascar. It is most common in the south of the island, around Tôlanaro, though it is found as far north as the Masoala Peninsula. It grows along the edges of swamps and in peaty or sandy soils at low altitudes.

The pitchers of N. madagascariensis play host to at least two species of infaunal spiders: Synema obscuripes and Theridion decaryi.

Infraspecific taxa

 N. madagascariensis var. macrocarpa Scott Elliot (1891)
 N. madagascariensis var. cylindrica Dub. (1906)

References

Further reading

 Bauer, U., C.J. Clemente, T. Renner & W. Federle 2012. Form follows function: morphological diversification and alternative trapping strategies in carnivorous Nepenthes pitcher plants. Journal of Evolutionary Biology 25(1): 90–102. 
  Blume, C.L. 1852. Ord. Nepenthaceae. In: Museum Botanicum Lugduno-Batavum, sive stirpium exoticarum novarum vel minus cognitarum ex vivis aut siccis brevis expositio. Tom. II. Nr. 1. E.J. Brill, Lugduni-Batavorum. pp. 5–10.
 Bonhomme, V., H. Pelloux-Prayer, E. Jousselin, Y. Forterre, J.-J. Labat & L. Gaume 2011. Slippery or sticky? Functional diversity in the trapping strategy of Nepenthes carnivorous plants. New Phytologist 191(2): 545–554. 
 Fashing, N.J. 2010.  In: M.W. Sabelis & J. Bruin (eds.) Trends in Acarology: Proceedings of the 12th International Congress. Springer Science, Dordrecht. pp. 81–84. 
 Grjebine, A. 1979.  Annales de la Société Entomologique de France 15(1): 53–74.
 James, G. 1988.  Carnivorous Plant Newsletter 17(4): 102–103.
 Kitching, R.L. 2000. Food Webs and Container Habitats: The natural history and ecology of phytotelmata. Cambridge University Press, Cambridge.
 Korthals, P.W. 1839. Over het geslacht Nepenthes. In: C.J. Temminck 1839–1842. Verhandelingen over de Natuurlijke Geschiedenis der Nederlandsche overzeesche bezittingen; Kruidkunde. Leiden. pp. 1–44, t. 1–4, 13–15, 20–22.
 Lecoufle, M. 1990. Nepenthes madagascariensis. In: Carnivorous Plants: Care and Cultivation. Blandford, London. pp. 134–135.
 Masters, M.T. 1881. Nepenthes madagascariensis, Hort. Veitch (?) ; Poiret. The Gardeners' Chronicle, new series, 16(413): 685.
 McPherson, S. 2010. An expedition to Madagascar. Planta Carnivora 32(1): 6–13.
 Meimberg, H., P. Dittrich, G. Bringmann, J. Schlauer & G. Heubl 2000. Molecular phylogeny of Caryophyllidae s.l. based on matK sequences with special emphasis on carnivorous taxa. Plant Biology 2(2): 218–228. 
 Meimberg, H., A. Wistuba, P. Dittrich & G. Heubl 2001. Molecular phylogeny of Nepenthaceae based on cladistic analysis of plastid trnK intron sequence data. Plant Biology 3(2): 164–175. 
  Meimberg, H. 2002.  Ph.D. thesis, Ludwig Maximilian University of Munich, Munich.
 Meimberg, H. & G. Heubl 2006. Introduction of a nuclear marker for phylogenetic analysis of Nepenthaceae. Plant Biology 8(6): 831–840. 
 Meimberg, H., S. Thalhammer, A. Brachmann & G. Heubl 2006. Comparative analysis of a translocated copy of the trnK intron in carnivorous family Nepenthaceae. Molecular Phylogenetics and Evolution 39(2): 478–490. 
 Ratsirarson, J. & J.A. Silander 1996. Structure and dynamics in Nepenthes madagascariensis pitcher plant micro-communities. Biotropica 28(2): 218–227. 
 Redwood, G.N. & J.C. Bowling 1990. Micropropagation of Nepenthes species. Botanic Gardens Micropropagation News 1(2): 19–20.
 Rembold, K. 2006. Zur Ökologie der karnivoren Nepenthes madagascariensis. Diplom thesis, University of Bonn, Bonn.
 Rembold, K., E. Fischer, M.A. Wetzel & W. Barthlott 2010. Prey composition of the pitcher plant Nepenthes madagascariensis. Journal of Tropical Ecology 26(4): 365–372. 
 Schlosser, E. 2005. Notes on some little known carnivorous plants from Madagascar. Carnivorous Plant Newsletter 34(4): 100–105.
 Schmid-Hollinger, R. 1982. Nepenthaceæ. In: B. Jonsell, M. Keraudren-Aymonin & R. Schmid-Höllinger. Flore de Madagascar et des Comores: Famille 84 — Crucifères / Famille 85 — Moringacées / Famille 86 — Népenthacées / Famille 87 — Droséracées. Muséum National d'Histoire Naturelle, Paris. pp. 41–51. .
  Schmid-Hollinger, R. N.d. Nepenthes madagascariensis. bio-schmidhol.ch. 
  Schmid-Hollinger, R. N.d. Nepenthaceae: Axile oder parietale Placentation? bio-schmidhol.ch. 
  Schmid-Hollinger, R. N.d. Kannendeckel (lid). bio-schmidhol.ch. 
  Veleba, V. 2003. Nepenthes trošku jinak. Trifid 2003(4): 38.

External links
 ARKive - images and movies of the Madagascar pitcher plant (Nepenthes madagascariensis)

madagascariensis
Carnivorous plants of Africa
Endemic flora of Madagascar
Plants described in 1797